A list of films produced in Italy in 1981 (see 1981 in film):

References

Footnotes

Sources

External links
Italian films of 1981 at the Internet Movie Database

1981
Films
Lists of 1981 films by country or language